Binalbagan, officially the Municipality of Binalbagan,  is a 1st class municipality in the province of Negros Occidental, Philippines. According to the 2020 census, it has a population of 71,407 people.

Major economic activities include manufacturing, agriculture, services, cottage industries and tourism. Binalbagan is also known for the Binalbagan Isabela Sugar Company (BISCOM).

Binalbagan became a town on May 15, 1572 and was one of the first two settlements of Negros Occidental (the second being the municipality of Ilog). On the record, Binalbagan is the oldest town in the whole Negros Island, thereby earning the title, “Banwang Panganay” or oldest town.

The municipality celebrates an annual fiesta called "The Balbagan Festival" every month of May.

Geography

Barangays
Binalbagan is politically subdivided into 16 barangays: thirteen (13) rural barangays and three (3) urban barangays.

Urban Barangays
 Pagla-um (Poblacion)
 San Pedro (Poblacion)
 Santo Rosario (Poblacion)

Rural Barangays
 Amontay
 Bagroy
 Bi-ao
 Canmoros
 Enclaro
 Marina
 Payao (formerly Soledad)
 Progreso
 San Jose
 San Juan
 San Teodoro
 San Vicente
 Santol
 Remedios

Climate

Demographics

The people in the city speak the Hiligaynon language (often called Ilonggo). Filipino and English are generally understood.

Economy

Education
Tertiary
 Binalbagan Catholic College
 Carlos Hilado Memorial State University (formerly Negros Occidental School of Fisheries)
 Southern Negros College
 Dynatech Industrial Institute

Notable personalities

Jose Miguel Tuason Arroyo (first gentleman of former Philippine President, Gloria Macapagal Arroyo)
Ignacio "Iggy" Tuason Arroyo, Jr. (member of the Philippine House of Representatives)
Augurio Abeto (dubbed as the "King of Hiligaynon Poetry")
Ian Clark Bautista (Southeast Asian Games Boxing Gold Medalist)
Rico Amancio (Masterchef Asia Contestant)

References

External links
 
Binalbagan Profile at the Official Website of Negros Occidental
Municipality of Binalbagan
 [ Philippine Standard Geographic Code]
Philippine Census Information
Local Governance Performance Management System

Municipalities of Negros Occidental